The Daytime Emmy Award for Outstanding Children's Animated Program had been awarded annually between 1985 and 2021. Until 1993, the award was just known as the Daytime Emmy Award for Outstanding Animated Program. Arthur held the record for most nominations (12) and Arthur and Muppet Babies tied for most wins (4). Nickelodeon had the most awards of any television network (9).

Typically five nominees were announced. An exception was the 2006 ceremony, where six nominees were announced. At the 2010 ceremony, four nominees were announced. The last time this had occurred was two decades prior in 1990 and 1985, the first time the award was handed out. TV specials had been known to appear on the list, as well as shows appearing at multiple years, despite having lasted only one season.

In November 2021, it was announced that all Daytime Emmy categories honoring children's programming will be retired in favor of a separate Children's & Family Emmy Awards ceremony that will be held starting in 2022.

1980s

1990s

2000s

2010s

2020s

Total awards won

Total awards
Nickelodeon - 9
PBS - 8
CBS - 4
ABC - 3
The WB - 3
Netflix - 3
FOX - 2
Amazon - 2
Disney Channel - 1
Nick Jr. - 1
Syndication - 1
The Learning Channel - 1

Multiple Nominations

12 nominations
 Arthur

6 nominations
 Animaniacs

5 nominations
 Curious George
 Dora the Explorer
 Muppet Babies
 Rugrats
 The Smurfs

4 nominations
 Doug
 Peep and the Big Wide World
 The Penguins of Madagascar
 Where on Earth Is Carmen Sandiego?
 Sid the Science Kid
3 nominations
 Alvin and the Chipmunks
 The Backyardigans
 Clifford the Big Red Dog
 Dragon Tales
 Kung Fu Panda: Legends of Awesomeness
 The Magic School Bus
 The New Adventures of Winnie the Pooh
 Tiny Toon Adventures
 ToddWorld
 WordGirl

2 nominations
 101 Dalmatians: The Series
 A Pup Named Scooby-Doo
 All Hail King Julien
 Batman: The Animated Series
 CBS Storybreak
 Craig of the Creek
 Darkwing Duck
 DuckTales
 Fat Albert and the Cosby Kids
 Hilda
 Kim Possible
 Little Einsteins
 Lost in Oz
 Madeline
 Niko and the Sword of Light
 Pinky and the Brain
 Pinky, Elmyra & the Brain
 Schoolhouse Rock!
 SpongeBob SquarePants
 Tales of Arcadia
 The Loud House

See also

 List of animation awards
 Daytime Emmy Award for Outstanding Pre-School Children's Animated Program

References

Retired Daytime Emmy Awards
American animation awards
Awards established in 1985
1985 establishments in the United States
Awards disestablished in 2021